The 1994 Canadian Grand Prix was a Formula One motor race held on 12 June 1994 at the Circuit Gilles Villeneuve in Montreal, Quebec, Canada. It was the sixth race of the 1994 Formula One World Championship and the 32nd Canadian Grand Prix.

The 69-lap race was won from pole position by Michael Schumacher, driving a Benetton-Ford, with Damon Hill second in a Williams-Renault and Jean Alesi third in a Ferrari. The win, Schumacher's fifth of the season, put him 33 points clear of Hill in the Drivers' Championship.

Report

Background
A temporary chicane was inserted between the hairpin and the Casino corner on the back straight, so as to decrease top speed and increase safety in the wake of Ayrton Senna's fatal crash at Imola. Teams had also been ordered to cut holes in the airboxes on the back of the cars, so as to decrease the 'ram air' effect and thus decrease engine output. As the FIA did not standardize where the holes had to be cut, each team interpreted the rule in different ways. Teams were also running on 'pump fuel' as of this race, in a bid to further lower engine output and trap speeds.

Simtek entered only one car for Canada, following the injuries to Andrea Montermini at the previous race in Spain. Andrea de Cesaris replaced the injured Karl Wendlinger at Sauber, and would thus make his 200th Grand Prix start at Montreal.

Race
Michael Schumacher took his fifth victory from six races in his Benetton, finishing nearly 40 seconds ahead of Damon Hill's Williams. Ferrari driver Jean Alesi finished third, just ahead of teammate Gerhard Berger, the last driver on the lead lap. Hill's teammate David Coulthard was fifth, scoring his first points in Formula One, while Christian Fittipaldi crossed the line sixth but was disqualified when his Footwork was found to be underweight, thus promoting Schumacher's teammate JJ Lehto to the final point.

During the race, Érik Comas became the first-ever F1 driver to be penalised for speeding in the pit lane; he received a ten-second stop-go penalty.

Post-race

Classification

Qualifying

Race

Championship standings after the race

Drivers' Championship standings

Constructors' Championship standings

References

Canadian Grand Prix
Canadian Grand Prix
Grand Prix
Grand Prix